Part 1 is an extended play by Australian pop singer Guy Sebastian, released on 2 December 2016.

Background and release
Sebastian released his seventh studio album Madness in November 2014. In May 2015, Sebastian competed in the Eurovision Song Contest in Vienna; coming fifth. Following this, Sebastian undertook a song-writing journey. Sebastian said;  “I wrote songs for 18 months and ended up pretty much scrapping it all, because it took that long just to figure out what I don’t want to do.” He created playlists on streaming services, which assisted him discover the production he wanted adding “Once I clicked into the sound I wanted, it was much easier.”

The EP’s theme stems from a focus on love and celebrating the important things in life like his career, relationships and family and follows on from the lead single "Set In Stone" - a song dedicated to his wife, Jules.

Reception
Kathy McCabe from news.com.au described the EP as "an eclectic collection of six songs which run the gamut of garage-flavoured R&B to electronic pop but all have two things in common, his distinctive voice and his muse Jules." adding "Sebastian has never been this personal in his lyrics... which all reassure his partner and mother of their two sons Hudson and Archer that she is the centre of his universe."

Track listing

Charts

Release history

References

Guy Sebastian albums
2016 EPs
EPs by Australian artists
Sony Music EPs